Bouchaïb El Ahrach, born September 5, 1972 in Tetuan, is a Moroccan football referee.

References 

1972 births
Living people
Moroccan football referees